The 2015 Stanley Cup playoffs of the National Hockey League (NHL) began on April 15, 2015, and ended on June 15, 2015, with the Chicago Blackhawks defeating the Tampa Bay Lightning four games to two in the 2015 Stanley Cup Finals.

The New York Rangers made the playoffs as the Presidents' Trophy winners with the most points (i.e. best record) during the regular season. They also came back from a 3–1 series deficit for the second consecutive year. The Detroit Red Wings increased their consecutive post-season appearance streak to 24 seasons, the longest current streak at the time and tied for the fourth-longest streak in NHL history. The Winnipeg Jets qualified for the playoffs for the first time since the former Atlanta Thrashers franchise relocated to Winnipeg in 2011; the only time that the Thrashers/Jets franchise made the post-season was in 2007, and the last time that the city of Winnipeg hosted a playoff game was in 1996, the season before the previous Winnipeg Jets team relocated to Phoenix, Arizona, to become the Coyotes. The Ottawa Senators became the first team in the NHL's modern era (since 1942–43) to overcome a 14-point deficit in the standings to clinch a playoff spot. Also, the Calgary Flames returned to the playoffs after a six-year absence. In total, five Canadian NHL teams qualified for the post-season, the most since 2004.

The Los Angeles Kings became the first defending Stanley Cup champions since the Carolina Hurricanes in 2007 to fail to make the playoffs. The Boston Bruins failed to make the playoffs for the first time since 2007 and became the first reigning Presidents' Trophy winners to miss the post-season since the Buffalo Sabres in 2008 (and the third overall). In addition, the San Jose Sharks failed to make the post-season for the first time since 2003, ending the NHL's second-longest active playoff streak.

For the first time since 2000, both the Eastern and Western Conference Finals went the full seven games.

The Tampa Bay Lightning became the first team in league history to face an Original Six team in all four rounds of the playoffs in the same year, as they played against the Detroit Red Wings, Montreal Canadiens, New York Rangers and Chicago Blackhawks, respectively. They also became the fourth team to defeat three consecutive Original Six teams.

The Lightning also tied the 1987 Philadelphia Flyers, 2004 Calgary Flames and 2014 Los Angeles Kings for playing the most playoff games (26) in a post season (later matched by the 2019 St. Louis Blues). The record was subsequently broken by the Dallas Stars during the expanded 2020 Stanley Cup playoffs.

Playoff seeds

This was the second year in which the top three teams in each division made the playoffs, along with two wild cards in each conference (for a total of eight playoff teams from each conference).

The following teams qualified for the playoffs:

Eastern Conference

Atlantic Division
 Montreal Canadiens, Atlantic Division champions – 110 points
 Tampa Bay Lightning – 108 points
 Detroit Red Wings – 100 points

Metropolitan Division
 New York Rangers, Metropolitan Division champions, Eastern Conference regular season champions, Presidents' Trophy winners – 113 points
 Washington Capitals – 101 points (40 , 6 points head-to-head vs. New York Islanders)
 New York Islanders – 101 points (40 , 5 points head-to-head vs. Washington)

Wild cards
 Ottawa Senators – 99 points
 Pittsburgh Penguins – 98 points

Western Conference

Central Division
 St. Louis Blues, Central Division champions – 109 points (42 )
 Nashville Predators – 104 points
 Chicago Blackhawks – 102 points

Pacific Division
 Anaheim Ducks, Pacific Division champions, Western Conference regular season champions – 109 points (43 )
 Vancouver Canucks – 101 points
 Calgary Flames – 97 points

Wild cards
 Minnesota Wild – 100 points
 Winnipeg Jets – 99 points

Playoff bracket
In each round, teams competed in a best-of-seven series following a 2–2–1–1–1 format (scores in the bracket indicate the number of games won in each best-of-seven series). The team with home ice advantage played at home for games one and two (and games five and seven, if necessary), and the other team was at home for games three and four (and game six, if necessary). The top three teams in each division made the playoffs, along with two wild cards in each conference, for a total of eight teams from each conference.

In the First Round, the lower seeded wild card in the conference played against the division winner with the best record while the other wild card played against the other division winner, and both wild cards were de facto #4 seeds. The other series matched the second and third place teams from the divisions. In the first two rounds, home ice advantage was awarded to the team with the better seed; in the last two rounds, it was awarded to the team that had the better regular season record.

Legend
 A1, A2, A3 – The first, second, and third place teams from the Atlantic Division, respectively
 M1, M2, M3 – The first, second, and third place teams from the Metropolitan Division, respectively
 C1, C2, C3 – The first, second, and third place teams from the Central Division, respectively
 P1, P2, P3 – The first, second, and third place teams from the Pacific Division, respectively
 WC – Wild Card teams

First Round

Eastern Conference First Round

(A1) Montreal Canadiens vs. (WC1) Ottawa Senators
The Montreal Canadiens finished first in the Atlantic division, earning 110 points. The Ottawa Senators finished as the Eastern Conference's first wild-card, earning 99 points. This was the second playoff meeting between these teams; their only previous meeting was in the 2013 Eastern Conference Quarterfinals, which Ottawa won in five games. Ottawa won three of the four games in the regular season series.

The Canadiens won the first three games of the series en route to defeating the Senators in six games. In game one, Brian Flynn scored the game-winning goal at 17:17 of the second period, and recorded two assists as the Canadiens won 4–3. Montreal's P. K. Subban was given a five-minute major and a game misconduct for slashing Ottawa's Mark Stone during the second period, resulting in a microfracture of Stone's right wrist, but did not face any further League discipline. Alex Galchenyuk's goal at 3:40 into overtime gave the Canadiens a 3–2 win in game two. Cameron replaced Andrew Hammond with Craig Anderson as his starting goalie for game three, but Dale Weise tied the game with 5:47 left in the third period, then scored at 3:40 into overtime to give Montreal a 2–1 win. Anderson rebounded in game four, stopping all 28 Montreal shots while Mike Hoffman scored the Senators' only goal to win 1–0. Ottawa then took game five by a score of 5–1 as Anderson stopped 45 of 46 shots, and Bobby Ryan scored two goals. The Canadiens then eliminated the Senators in Game 6 2–0 as goaltender Carey Price stopped all 43 of Ottawa's shots.

(A2) Tampa Bay Lightning vs. (A3) Detroit Red Wings
The Tampa Bay Lightning finished second in the Atlantic Division, earning 108 points. The Detroit Red Wings earned 100 points in the regular season to finish third in the Atlantic. This was the first playoff meeting between these two teams. Tampa Bay won three of the four games in the regular season series.

The Lightning defeated the Red Wings in seven games. Detroit goalie Petr Mrazek made 44 saves and Pavel Datsyuk recorded a goal and assist in a 3–2 win in game one. Tampa Bay took game two, 5–1, scoring four goals on 18 shots against Mrazek, including two from Tyler Johnson. Mrazek rebounded in game three, stopping all 22 shots in a 3–0 victory. In game four, the Lightning came back from a 2–0 third-period deficit to tie the game after Johnson and Ondrej Palat scored 1:17 apart. Johnson then scored at 2:25 of overtime for a 3–2 Tampa Bay win. Mrazek then recorded another shutout in game five, stopping 28 shots in a 4–0 win. In game six, Johnson scored two goals as the Lightning built a 3–0 second-period lead en route to a 5–2 victory. Although he was not penalized during game six, Detroit's Niklas Kronwall was later suspended one game by the NHL for charging Tampa Bay's Nikita Kucherov late in the second period. In game seven, Lightning goaltender Ben Bishop stopped all of Detroit's 31 shots, Braydon Coburn scored what proved to be the game-winning goal 3:58 into the third period and Anton Stralman scored the empty netter with 1:18 remaining in the game to give Tampa Bay a 2–0 victory.

(M1) New York Rangers vs. (WC2) Pittsburgh Penguins
The New York Rangers earned the Presidents' Trophy as the NHL's best regular season team, earning 113 points. The Pittsburgh Penguins finished as the Eastern Conference's second wild-card, earning 98 points. This was the sixth playoff meeting between these teams, with Pittsburgh having won four of the five previous series. Their most recent meeting was in the previous year's Eastern Conference Second Round, which New York won in seven games. New York won three of the four games in the regular season series.

The Rangers defeated the Penguins in five games. In game one, Derick Brassard and Ryan McDonagh each had goals, while goaltender Henrik Lundqvist stopped 24 out of 25 shots, to help give the Rangers a 2–1 victory. In game two, Sidney Crosby scored two goals in a span of 4:39 to help give Pittsburgh a 3–1 second-period lead, en route to a 4–3 win. The Rangers took game three, 2–1, as they held the Penguins to just 11 shots on goal through the first and second periods, and Lundqvist made 12 out of 13 saves in the third. Rookie centre Kevin Hayes then scored the game-winning goal 3:14 into overtime of game four to give the Rangers another 2–1 victory. The Rangers then recorded a third consecutive 2–1 victory in game five, with Carl Hagelin scoring 10:52 into overtime, to take the series. Hagelin became the first Ranger to accomplish this feat since Stephane Matteau scored a goal in game seven against the New Jersey Devils in 1994. The Penguins were eliminated in the first round for the first time since 2012.

(M2) Washington Capitals vs. (M3) New York Islanders
The Washington Capitals finished second in the Metropolitan Division, earning 101 points. The New York Islanders also earned 101 points during the regular season, but they finished third in the Metropolitan Division as Washington won the second tie-breaker of head-to-head points. This was the seventh playoff meeting between these teams, with New York having won five of the six previous series. Their most recent meeting was in the 1993 Patrick Division Semifinals, which New York won in six games. The teams split the four-game regular season series, with each team winning twice at home.

The Capitals defeated the Islanders in seven games. The Islanders took game one, 4–1, led by Brock Nelson's two goals, and Josh Bailey's goal and an assist. In game two, Washington came back from a 3–1 second-period deficit to score three unanswered goals to win, 4–3, despite being forced to start rookie goalie Philipp Grubauer in this match in place of an ill Braden Holtby. Games three and four ended in overtime: John Tavares scored 15 seconds into the extra period to give the Islanders a 2–1 victory in Game 3, and Nicklas Backstrom's goal 11:09 into overtime gave the Capitals a 2–1 victory in game four. Washington then controlled game five with a 5–1 victory, led by Evgeny Kuznetsov's two goals and an assist. The Islanders then took Game 6, 3–1, as Nikolay Kulemin scored at 10:33 of the third period to break a 1–1 tie, and Cal Clutterbuck added an empty netter. Game six proved to be the last playoff game that the Islanders played at Nassau Coliseum (until 2019) before moving full-time to the Barclays Center for three seasons, as Washington's Evgeny Kuznetsov scored the game-winning goal 12:42 into the third period of game seven to help give the Capitals the victory, 2–1.

Western Conference First Round

(C1) St. Louis Blues vs. (WC1) Minnesota Wild
The St. Louis Blues finished first in the Central Division, earning 109 points. The Minnesota Wild finished as the Western Conference's first wild-card, earning 100 points. This was the first playoff meeting between these two teams. The teams split the four-game regular season series, with each team winning once at home and once on the road.

The Wild defeated the Blues in six games. Minnesota took game one, 4–2, as goaltender Devan Dubnyk recorded 19 saves. Vladimir Tarasenko then recorded a hat trick to help lead the Blues to a 4–1 victory in game two. In game three, Dubnyk stopped all 17 St. Louis shots to lead the Wild to a 3–0 win. The Blues then rebounded in game four, as five different players scored off of Dubnyk in a 6–1 win. The Wild goalie responded in game five by making 37 saves while Nino Niederreiter and Mikko Koivu scored in a span of 1:26 in the second period to win 4–1. Minnesota then eliminated St. Louis in game six with another 4–1 victory, as Dubnyk made 30 saves and Zach Parise scored two goals.

(C2) Nashville Predators vs. (C3) Chicago Blackhawks
The Nashville Predators finished second in the Central Division, earning 104 points. The Chicago Blackhawks earned 102 points during the regular season to finish third in the Central Division. This was the second playoff meeting between these teams; their only previous meeting was in the 2010 Western Conference Quarterfinals, which Chicago won in six games. Chicago won three of the four games in the regular season series.

The Blackhawks defeated the Predators in six games. In game one, Nashville scored three-straight first period goals on Chicago goaltender Corey Crawford, prompting Blackhawks Head Coach Joel Quenneville to put backup Scott Darling in net. Chicago then rallied, scoring three-straight second period goals to tie the game before Duncan Keith scored 7:49 into double overtime to give the Blackhawks a 4–3 victory. Crawford again started in game two, but the Predators scored four unanswered goals on him, including two goals from Craig Smith, to tie the series with a 6–2 win. Darling was named the starter for game three and then stopped 35 Nashville shots, while Chicago scored three second-period goals to grab a 4–2 win. Game four ended at 1:00 into triple overtime when Brent Seabrook's one-timer from the blue line went past Nashville goalie Pekka Rinne into the net, giving the Blackhawks a 3–2 victory. Filip Forsberg recorded his first NHL hat-trick, and Nashville scored three goals in a 2:27 span in the third period in game five to win, 5–2. In game six, Quenneville pulled Darling after giving up three first period goals on 12 Nashville shots. Chicago then rallied behind Crawford, with Keith scoring the game-winning goal 16:12 into the third period to give the Blackhawks a 4–3 win and the series.

(P1) Anaheim Ducks vs. (WC2) Winnipeg Jets
The Anaheim Ducks finished first in the Pacific Division, earning 109 points. The Winnipeg Jets finished as the Western Conference's second wild-card, earning 99 points. This was the first playoff meeting between these two teams. Anaheim won all three games in the regular season series. This series also marked the first appearance of a team representing Winnipeg in the Stanley Cup playoffs in 19 years, as the Jets made the playoffs for the first time since moving from Atlanta, and for the second time in franchise history since their only playoff appearance in 2007 when they were swept in the conference quarterfinals, leaving them entering the 2014–15 season as the only NHL franchise to never record a post-season win. The most recent team to represent Winnipeg prior to this was the original Winnipeg Jets, who lost in the Western Conference Quarterfinals in 1996.

The Ducks won each of the first three games with third-period comebacks en route to sweeping the series against the Jets. Down 2–1 in the third period of game one, Corey Perry scored twice, Ryan Getzlaf scored once and Sami Vatanen scored once to help give Anaheim a 4–2 win. Winnipeg entered the third period of game two with a 1–0 lead, but Anaheim prevailed, 2–1, after Patrick Maroon tied the game midway through the period and then Jakob Silfverberg scored the game-winning goal with 21 seconds left. In game three, the Jets held a 4–3 lead late in the third period, but Ryan Kesler tied the game with 2:14 left in regulation and Rickard Rakell scored 5:12 into overtime to give the Ducks a 5–4 win. Anaheim only needed to come from behind from a one-goal deficit in the first period of game four, scoring three unanswered goals between the first and third periods. Kesler scored two third-period goals, and Perry recorded two assists, to close out the series for the Ducks with a 5–2 victory.

(P2) Vancouver Canucks vs. (P3) Calgary Flames
The Vancouver Canucks finished second in the Pacific Division, earning 101 points. The Calgary Flames earned 97 points during the regular season to finish third in the Pacific Division. This was the seventh playoff meeting between these teams with Calgary having won four of the six previous series. Their most recent meeting was in the 2004 Western Conference Quarterfinals, which Calgary won in seven games. The Flames qualified for the playoffs for the first time since 2009. The teams split the four-game regular season series, with each team winning once at home and once on the road.

The Flames defeated the Canucks in six games. Calgary rallied from a one-goal deficit in game one, as David Jones tied the game 7:59 into the third and Kris Russell scored the winning goal with 29.6 seconds left to give the Flames a 2–1 win. The Canucks tied the series with a 4–1 win, as goalie Eddie Lack made 22 out of 23 saves and Alex Burrows recorded two assists. With 1:17 left to play, a fight broke out that resulted in 132 penalty minutes, with the Flames' Deryk Engelland given a game misconduct for instigating it, but eventually the league rescinded Engelland's penalty and instead fined Calgary head coach Bob Hartley $50,000 for his responsibility for the incident. Jonas Hiller made 23 saves to help give the Flames a 4–2 win in game three. In game four, Calgary scored three first-period goals out of seven shots off of Lack. Ryan Miller replaced Lack to start the second period, but Hiller made 28 total saves en route to a 3–1 win. Miller then made 20 saves and Daniel Sedin scored the winning goal 1:47 into the third period to help give the Canucks a 2–1 win in Game five. In game six, Hartley pulled Hiller after he allowed two goals on his first three shots, and put Karri Ramo in net. The Flames tied the game in the second period, and then Matt Stajan scored what proved to be the game-winning goal late in the third period. Two empty net goals in the final minute of the game sealed the series victory for the Flames.

Second Round

Eastern Conference Second Round

(A1) Montreal Canadiens vs. (A2) Tampa Bay Lightning
This was the third playoff meeting for these teams; the teams had split their two previous playoff series. Their most recent meeting was in the previous year's Eastern Conference First Round, in which Montreal swept Tampa Bay out of the playoffs. Tampa Bay won all five games in the regular season series.

The Lightning defeated the Canadiens in six games. In game one, Nikita Kucherov scored 2:06 into double overtime to give Tampa Bay a 2–1 win. This winning goal was controversial because the Lightning appeared to have been offside on the play, but nothing was called by the linesmen. Earlier at 2:56 of the first overtime period, Kucherov's apparent winning goal was waved off after officials ruled that he pushed Carey Price's pad into the net after the Montreal goalie made the initial save. The Lightning also won game two, 6–2, scoring four power play goals. Montreal's Brandon Prust was then fined $5,000 for his postgame derogatory public comments directed toward Referee Brad Watson, which he later apologized for the day afterward. In game three, Tyler Johnson scored with 1.1 seconds left to give Tampa Bay a 2–1 victory. The Canadiens stayed alive in game four, as Max Pacioretty recorded a shorthanded goal and two assists, as Montreal built a 5–0 second-period lead en route to a 6–2 win. Then in game five, P.A. Parenteau scored with 4:07 left in regulation to give the Canadiens a 2–1 victory. In game six, Ben Bishop stopped 18 of 19 Montreal shots, and Kucherov scored two goals, as Tampa Bay won 4–1 to take the series.

(M1) New York Rangers vs. (M2) Washington Capitals
This was the ninth playoff meeting for these teams, and their fifth in the last seven years; the teams have split their eight previous playoff series. Their most recent meeting was in the 2013 Eastern Conference Quarterfinals, which New York won in seven games. New York won three of the four games in the regular season series.

The Rangers overcame a 3–1 series deficit to eliminate the Capitals in seven games. Joel Ward scored with 1.3 seconds left to give Washington a 2–1 win in game one. The Rangers took game two, 3–2, as Chris Kreider and Dan Boyle recorded first-period goals and Henrik Lundqvist stopped 30 out of 32 shots. In game three, Braden Holtby stopped all of the Rangers' 30 shots, and Jay Beagle's second-period goal helped give the Capitals a 1–0 win. Holtby then made 29 out of 30 saves in game four, while rookie Andre Burakovsky scored his first two postseason goals in a 2–1 victory for Washington. In game five, the Capitals appeared to have scored the icebreaker with 2:09 left in the second period when Matt Niskanen's shot went past Lundqvist, but officials waved off the goal and ruled that Ward interfered with the Rangers goalie. Curtis Glencross would later score the icebreaker for Washington at 10:54 of the third period. But Kreider scored with 1:41 remaining in regulation to tie the game, 1–1, then Ryan McDonagh won it at 9:37 into overtime to give the Rangers a 2–1 victory. Game six saw Kreider score two first-period goals to help the Rangers build a 4–1 lead in the third period before holding off a late comeback by the Capitals to win 4–3. Then in game seven, Derek Stepan scored at 11:24 into overtime on a set play off the faceoff to give the Rangers a 2–1 victory and the 4–3 series win to move on to the Eastern Conference Final for the second time in as many years. This was also the second consecutive playoffs in which the Rangers were able to overcome a 3–1 series deficit, an NHL first. As well, this was only the second time the Rangers overcame a 3–1 series deficit in franchise history. With this series loss, the Capitals fell to 6–5 all-time in series when they lead 3–1, with this fifth loss becoming most among NHL teams.

Western Conference Second Round

(C3) Chicago Blackhawks vs. (WC1) Minnesota Wild
This was the third year in a row in which the Blackhawks and Wild had met in the postseason, and their third meeting overall. The Blackhawks won both previous series, their most recent meeting was in the previous year's Western Conference Second Round where Chicago won in six games. Chicago won three of the five games in the regular season series.

The Blackhawks swept the Wild. In game one, after Chicago scored three unanswered first-period goals, followed by Minnesota scoring three of their own to tie the game, Teuvo Teravainen scored with 59 seconds left in the second period to help give the Blackhawks a 4–3 win. Patrick Kane then scored two goals in game two to help give Chicago a 4–1 victory. In game three, Corey Crawford stopped all of Minnesota's 30 shots, and Kane's power play goal in the first period helped give the Blackhawks a 1–0 win. Chicago then won game four,  4–3, with four different Blackhawks recording goals, but had to hold off an attempted comeback by Minnesota, who scored two goals 51 seconds apart in the final minutes of the game.

(P1) Anaheim Ducks vs. (P3) Calgary Flames
This was the second playoff meeting between these teams; their only previous meeting was in the 2006 Western Conference Quarterfinals, which Anaheim won in seven games. Anaheim won three of the five games in the regular season series.

The Ducks eliminated the Flames in five games. Anaheim took game one, 6–1, scoring three goals apiece against both Calgary starting goalie Jonas Hiller and backup Karri Ramo. Flames coach Bob Hartley then decided to start Ramo for the rest of the series. In game two, Ducks goalie Frederik Andersen stopped all of Calgary's 30 shots in a 3–0 victory. In game three, Anaheim held a 3–2 lead in the third period when Sam Bennett appeared to have tied the game with 6:22 left in regulation, but officials said no goal on the ice and video review ruled that it was inconclusive as to whether the puck completely crossed the goal line. However, with 19.5 seconds remaining in regulation, and the Flames on essentially a 5-on-3 advantage because of pulling their goalie for an extra attacker, coincidental minors against both teams, and a delay of game penalty on Sami Vatanen of Anaheim, Johnny Gaudreau scored to tie the game. Then at 4:24 of overtime, Mikael Backlund scored his first ever postseason goal on a delayed penalty to give Calgary the win, 4–3. The Ducks responded with a 4–2 win in game four, as a high-sticking double minor penalty on Calgary's Joe Colborne at the end of the second period led to Matt Beleskey's power play goal to give Anaheim a 3–2 lead, followed by Patrick Maroon's empty netter. In game five, Corey Perry scored 2:26 into overtime, giving the Ducks the series win.

Conference Finals

Eastern Conference Final

(M1) New York Rangers vs. (A2) Tampa Bay Lightning
This was the first playoff meeting between these teams. This was the Rangers' second consecutive Conference Finals appearance, and their third overall in the last four years; they defeated the Montreal Canadiens in six games in the previous year. Tampa Bay most recently made it to the Conference Finals in 2011, where they lost in seven games to the Boston Bruins. Tampa Bay won all three games in the regular season series.

The Lightning defeated the Rangers in seven games. In game one, Dominic Moore scored with 2:25 left to give the Rangers a 2–1 win. Tyler Johnson then recorded a hat trick, scoring a shorthanded, a power play and an even strength goal, as he led the Lightning to a 6–2 victory in game two. In game three, Nikita Kucherov scored 3:33 into overtime to give Tampa Bay a 6–5 win. The Rangers then responded with a 5–1 win in game four, as Rick Nash scored twice and Henrik Lundqvist stopped 38 out of 39 shots. Ben Bishop shut out the Rangers in game five, stopping all 26 shots in the Lightning's 2–0 win. In game six, Derick Brassard recorded a hat trick and two assists as the Rangers went on to win, 7–3. Game seven, however, saw Tampa Bay record another 2–0 victory to eliminate the Rangers — the first time the Rangers had ever lost a game seven at home in their history (and the first time they lost an elimination game at home since the 2007 playoffs)  — as Bishop stopped all 22 New York shots while the Lightning scored two goals out of their first three third-period shots.

Western Conference Final

(P1) Anaheim Ducks vs. (C3) Chicago Blackhawks
This was the first playoff meeting between these teams. Anaheim most recently made it to the Conference Finals in 2007, when they defeated the Detroit Red Wings in six games. This was Chicago's third consecutive Conference Finals appearance, and their fifth overall in the last seven years; they were defeated by the Los Angeles Kings in seven games in the previous year. Chicago won two of the three games in the regular season series.

The Blackhawks eliminated the Ducks in seven games. Anaheim took game one, 4–1, getting goals from four different players and Frederik Andersen stopping 26 out of 27 shots. Game two was the longest game in Chicago franchise history as Marcus Kruger scored 16:12 into triple-overtime to give the Blackhawks a 3–2 victory. Anaheim defeated Chicago in game three, 2–1, as Simon Despres' first career Stanley Cup playoff goal with 55 seconds left in the second period proved to be the difference. In game four, a total of six goals were scored during the third period. After the period began with a 1–1 tie, the Blackhawks scored two consecutive goals, followed by the Ducks scoring three in 37 seconds, before Patrick Kane's power play goal tied it again at 4–4. The contest ended when Antoine Vermette scored at 5:37 of double overtime to give Chicago a 5–4 victory. The Ducks built a 3–0 first period lead before Chicago scored two in the second to cut the score to 3–2. Patrick Maroon scored at 14:45 of the third period to increase Anaheim's lead to 4–2, but Jonathan Toews scored twice inside the final two minutes of regulation to tie the game and force overtime. This time, Matt Beleskey scored 45 seconds into the extra period to give the Ducks the 5–4 victory. But in game six, the Blackhawks built a 3–0 second-period lead, with Duncan Keith recording an assist in each of those three goals, en route to a 5–2 win. And in game seven, Toews scored twice as Chicago built a 4–0 second-period lead en route to a 5–3 victory.

Stanley Cup Finals

This was the first playoff meeting between these two teams. Both teams won their last appearance in the Finals; Tampa Bay defeated Calgary in seven games in 2004, while Chicago defeated Boston in six games in 2013. This was the Lightning's second appearance in the Finals; the Blackhawks made their thirteenth Finals appearance, and their third in six years. Upon winning the Finals, Chicago had won three Stanley Cups in the past six years. This was also the first Stanley Cup Finals not to have a game go into overtime since 2009.

Player statistics

Skaters
These are the top ten skaters based on points.

Goaltenders
This is a combined table of the top five goaltenders based on goals against average and the top five goaltenders based on save percentage, with at least 420 minutes played. The table is sorted by GAA, and the criteria for inclusion are bolded.

Television
In Canada, the 2015 Stanley Cup playoffs were the first postseason under Rogers Media' 12-year contract for Canadian television and digital media rights to the NHL. On television, national coverage of playoff games were split between Sportsnet channels and CBC (through Hockey Night in Canada). French-language coverage of all games was carried by TVA Sports. Selected games were simulcast with Punjabi-language commentary on Omni Television.

In the United States, national coverage of playoff games aired on either NBC, NBCSN, CNBC, NHL Network, or USA Network. USA Network broadcast NHL games for the first time since they aired them from 1979 to 1985. During the first round, these national telecasts co-existed with those of regional rightsholders, after which NBC had exclusive rights to the remaining games. Seven first-round games were televised exclusively in the U.S. on NBC.

In Canada, first-round viewership improved over the previous season, with one of the games in the Montreal-Ottawa series on CBC seen by 3.76 million viewers. However, following the elimination of Canadian teams from contention and an all-U.S. final, ratings dropped significantly, with Numeris estimating an overall decrease of 8% in average viewership on CBC, and a 14% decrease in average viewership for Sportsnet in comparison to TSN's 2014 playoff coverage. Game six of the Final, facing competition from a Team Canada match in the 2015 FIFA Women's World Cup on CTV and TSN, and the Toronto Blue Jays (in the midst of a major winning streak) on Sportsnet, was the lowest-rated deciding game since game seven in 2003.

By contrast, ratings in the United States were strong for NBC and its cable networks. This also extended to the Montreal-Ottawa first-round series, where it faced no competition from a U.S. regional rightsholder: games six and three of the all-Canadian series on NBCSN ended up being the top and the second-most watched first-round contests on U.S. cable, respectively. Game seven of the N.Y. Rangers-Tampa Bay Eastern Conference Finals produced a 2.65 metered market overnight rating, making it NBCSN's second-highest rated non-Final NHL game. Game seven of the Anaheim-Chicago Western Conference Finals then generated a 3.27 metered market rating, the highest rated non-Final overnight NHL game on NBC. During the Final, game six was seen by 7.6 million viewers nationally on NBC. Ratings for game six were especially strong in Chicago and Tampa Bay: it was the most-watched NHL broadcast locally in Chicago history, and the second-highest in Tampa Bay. Overall, it was the second-most-watched Stanley Cup Finals since 1995, averaging a 3.2 rating and 5.6 million viewers on NBC and NBCSN, trailing only the 2013 Stanley Cup Finals.

References

Stanley Cup playoffs
playoffs